This article lists political parties in Haiti, both current and historical. Haiti is a country in transition to democracy, and few political parties have a strong organizational base or command a national following.

List of parties represented in the National Assembly

List of parties not represented in the National Assembly

Hypothetical polling

Defunct parties 
 Haitian Communist Party (1934–1936) – Banned Communist
 Haitian Socialist Party (1946) – Communist
 Popular Socialist Party (Haiti) (1946–1948) – Banned Communist
 Unified Party of Haitian Communists (1968–1969) – Banned  Communist
 Front for Hope (1995–2009) Left-wing nationalism, Democratic socialism

See also 
 Politics of Haiti
 List of political parties by country

Notes and references 
Notes

Sources

Haiti
 
Lists of organizations based in Haiti
Haiti